Eddie Gladden (December 6, 1937 – September 30, 2003) was an American jazz drummer.

Career
Gladden played professionally from 1962 in his hometown of Newark. In 1972 he began working with James Moody. During the rest of his career he worked with Eddie Jefferson, Richie Cole, Cecil Payne, Horace Silver, David Fathead Newman, Larry Young, Freddie Roach, Jimmy McGriff, Richard "Groove" Holmes, Kirk Lightsey, Clifford Jordan, Albert Dailey, Jimmy Ponder, Shirley Scott, and Mickey Tucker, among others. He played in Dexter Gordon's quartet from 1977, touring and recording.

He died of a heart attack in Newark at the age of 65. Gladden never recorded as a session leader.

Discography

As sideman
With Richie Cole
 New York Afternoon (Muse, 1977)
 Alto Madness (Muse, 1978)
 Keeper of the Flame (Muse, 1979)

With Dexter Gordon
 Great Encounters (Columbia, 1978)
 Manhattan Symphonie (Columbia, 1978)
 American Classic (Elektra Musician 1982)
 Nights at the Keystone (Blue Note, 1985)
 Nights at the Keystone Volume 1 (Blue Note, 1990)
 Nights at the Keystone Volume 2 (Blue Note, 1990)
 Nights at the Keystone Volume 3 (Blue Note, 1990)
 Sophisticated Giant (Columbia, 1990)
 Ballads (Blue Note, 1991)

With Eddie Jefferson
 Things Are Getting Better (Muse, 1974)
 Still on the Planet (Muse, 1976)
 The Live-Liest (Muse, 1979)

With Kirk Lightsey
 Isotope (Criss Cross, 1983)
 Everything Happens to Me (Timeless, 1983)
 Kirk 'n Marcus (Criss Cross, 1987)
 Everything Is Changed (Sunnyside, 1987)
 First Affairs (Lime Tree, 1987)
 Temptation (Baystate, 1988)

With James Moody
 Never Again! (Muse, 1972)
 Timeless Aura (Vanguard, 1976)
 Sun Journey  (Vanguard, 1976)

With John Patton
 Blue Planet Man (King, 1993)
 This One's for Ja (DIW, 1996)

With Freddie Roach
 Mocha Motion! (Prestige, 1967)
 My People (Soul People) (Prestige, 1967)

With Mickey Tucker
 The New Heritage Keyboard Quartet (Blue Note, 1973)
 Triplicity (Xanadu, 1975)
 Sojourn (Xanadu, 1977)
 Mister Mysterious (Muse, 1978)
 Mister Mysterious (Muse, 1979)
 Theme for a Woogie-Boogie (Denon, 1979)

With Larry Young
 Contrasts (Blue Note, 1967)
 Heaven on Earth (Blue Note, 1968)
 Mother Ship (Blue Note, 1980)

With others
 Chet Baker, Blues for a Reason (Criss Cross, 1985)
 George Cables, Circle (Contemporary, 1985)
 Ronnie Cuber, The Eleventh Day of Aquarius (Xanadu, 1978)
 Albert Dailey, Textures (Muse, 1981)
 Bruce Forman, The Bash (Muse, 1985)
 Della Griffin, I'll Get By (Muse, 1996)
 Clifford Jordan, Two Tenor Winner (Criss Cross, 1985)
 Eric Kloss, Battle of the Saxes (Muse, 1977)
 Jimmy McGriff, The Main Squeeze (Groove Merchant, 1974)
 David "Fathead" Newman, Heads Up (Atlantic, 1987)
 Jimmy Ponder, Jump (Muse, 1989)
 Jimmy Raney, The Master (Criss Cross, 1984)
 Rufus Reid, Perpetual Stroll (Theresa, 1981)
 Red Rodney, Red, White and Blues (Muse, 1978)
 John Stubblefield, Confessin' (Soul Note, 1985)
 Buddy Terry, Natural Soul (Prestige, 1968)

References

J. Kent Williams, "Eddie Gladden". The New Grove Dictionary of Jazz.

1937 births
2003 deaths
Musicians from Newark, New Jersey
American jazz drummers
Musicians from New Jersey
20th-century American drummers
American male drummers
20th-century American male musicians
American male jazz musicians